Maharao Pragmulji III of Kutch (3 May 1936 – 28 May 2021) was the ruler of Kutch from Jadeja dynasty.

Biography

He did his primary education from Mayo College, Ajmer and Doon School, Dehradoon and later graduated from The Hindu College, Delhi University.

He was the eldest son of his father and erstwhile ruler of Kutch, Maharao Shri Madansinhji, and Maharani Bai Shri Rajendra Kunverba Sahib and became the heir apparent with the title of Yuvraj Sahib on the succession of his father, 26 February 1948.

He was installed in the Tila-medi at Prag Mahal Palace, Bhuj on 17 October 1991 upon demise of his father Maharao Shri Madansinji, under the name and style of H.H. Maharajadhiraj Mirza Maharao Shri Pragmulji III Sawai Bahadur, Maharao of Kutch.

The Ranjit Vilas Palace, Prag Mahal and Vijay Vilas Palace are some of the royal palaces, which belong to the erstwhile rulers of Kutch and are some of their private properties. Other private palaces belonging to the dynasty include Chavda Rakhal The royal family was in the court for rights of ownership that was in dispute which cropped up within various sons of Maharaja Madansinhji, who died in 1991. However, the court had upheld the will of Madansinhji as valid and Pragmulji III as such was declared the lawful owner of these properties, some of which have been converted into luxury hotels by him.

Pragmulji III lived in Mumbai and also had a house in London but often came to Bhuj, Kutch to look after his heritage and recently spent time and money in repair and restoration of Prag Mahal & Aina Mahal, which were badly damaged in 2001 Gujarat earthquake. He was also instrumental in putting up of a bust of Khengarji III at office of New Kandla, his great-grandfather, who had founded the port city of Kandla in 1930–31.

He died on 28 May 2021 due to complications from COVID-19 in Bhuj.

References

1936 births
2021 deaths
Maharajas of Kutch
The Doon School alumni
St. Stephen's College, Delhi alumni
Mayo College alumni
Indian Hindus
Indian royalty
Gujarati people
Deaths from the COVID-19 pandemic in India
Pretenders